The 1991 NBA Finals was the championship round of the 1990–91 National Basketball Association (NBA) season, and the conclusion of the season's playoffs. It was also the first NBA Finals broadcast by NBC after 17 years with CBS.

The Eastern Conference champion Chicago Bulls took on the Western Conference champion Los Angeles Lakers for the title, with Chicago having home court advantage. It was Michael Jordan's first NBA Finals appearance, Magic Johnson's last, and the last NBA Finals for the Lakers until 2000. The Bulls would win the series, 4–1. Jordan averaged 31.2 points on 56% shooting, 11.4 assists, 6.6 rebounds, 2.8 steals and 1.4 blocks en route to his first NBA Finals MVP Award.

The series was not the first time that the Bulls and Lakers faced off in the playoffs. Prior to 1991, they met for four postseason series (1968, 1971, 1972 and 1973), all Lakers victories. Chicago was a member of the Western Conference at the time and moved into the East in 1980. The 1991 Finals marked the first time the Bulls defeated the Lakers in a playoff series.

This series would mark the end of the Lakers Showtime era and the beginning of the Bulls' dynasty. After winning five championships in eight finals appearances in the 1980s, the Lakers would struggle for the rest of the 1990s before winning five championships between the 2000 and 2010 seasons.

The 1991 Lakers were led by Johnson, who was 31 and playing in what would be his last full season, as well as fellow All-Star teammate James Worthy; Kareem Abdul-Jabbar had retired two seasons earlier. The Bulls, led by Jordan and small forward Scottie Pippen, would win five more championships after 1991 in a seven-year span, cementing their status as a dynasty. Jordan became only the third player in NBA history (after George Mikan and Abdul-Jabbar) to capture the scoring title and a championship in the same season.

Background

Chicago Bulls

The 1990–91 season marked the Bulls' 25th in franchise history. The team was coming off a grueling seven-game loss to the Detroit Pistons in the 1990 Eastern Conference Finals, and in the six years since Michael Jordan joined the Bulls, they were showing signs of improvement.

They managed to put it all together that season, winning a then-franchise record 61 games. Jordan won the scoring title for a fifth consecutive season, but the team was no longer a one-man show of years past. Instead, Jordan distributed the ball with regularity, thanks in large part to the triangle offense instituted by head coach Phil Jackson and assistant Tex Winter. This gave the Bulls additional offensive weapons to choose from, ranging from wingman Scottie Pippen and post players Horace Grant and Bill Cartwright to shooters such as John Paxson and B. J. Armstrong. Jordan's improved all-around play earned him his second MVP award.

In the playoffs, the Bulls lost only once in the first three rounds. They swept the New York Knicks in the first round, then eliminated the Philadelphia 76ers in the second round. Their much-awaited rematch with the Detroit Pistons in the conference finals showcased the maturity and poise that the Bulls displayed all season, as they swept the injury-riddled Pistons team. In a last show of defiance, most of the Pistons walked off the court with :08 left on the clock in a blowout loss at home so as not to congratulate the new Eastern Conference champions, though Joe Dumars, Vinnie Johnson, and John Salley did remain to shake the Bulls' hands.

Los Angeles Lakers

The Lakers were coming off a second-round loss to the Phoenix Suns in prior season's playoffs. Even though the Lakers won 63 games that season, and Magic Johnson won league MVP and surpassed Oscar Robertson for the all-time career assist record, it was clear that the team was growing weary of head coach Pat Riley's intense approach.

The Lakers replaced Riley with Mike Dunleavy, Sr., formerly an assistant coach with the Milwaukee Bucks. Dunleavy then abandoned the trademark Showtime offense in favor of a more deliberate style of play, but despite the change in playbook, the Lakers still enjoyed an impressive season, winning 58 games.

In the playoffs, the Lakers swept the Houston Rockets in the first round, then eliminated Run TMC and the Golden State Warriors in the second round. Next up for the Lakers were the Portland Trail Blazers, who were coming off a trip to the NBA finals the previous year. The Lakers stunned the Blazers in Portland to open the series, and went on to win the conference finals in six games.

Road to the Finals

Regular season series
Both teams split the two meetings, each won by the home team:

1991 NBA Finals team rosters

Chicago Bulls

Los Angeles Lakers

Series summary

Game 1

Michael Jordan started dominating with 15 points, 3 rebounds and 5 assists in the first quarter alone. In the second quarter, the Lakers continued to stay competitive despite Magic Johnson not attempting one field goal in the second quarter. Despite this, Magic Johnson would hit back-to-back 3 pointers in the third quarter to give the Lakers their largest lead, and also Magic Johnson's 29th career playoff triple-double. Jordan made a comeback in the fourth quarter with 13 points, but it was Scottie Pippen's two free throws that would give the Bulls a 91-89 lead. Each team ran the shot clock down but neither could hit a shot until Sam Perkins hit a 3-pointer (the potential game winner) with 14 seconds left to give the Lakers a 92-91 lead. Michael Jordan's 17-foot jumper then rattled out and was rebounded by Byron Scott, who was fouled with 2.7 seconds remaining. Scott missed the first of his two free throws and made the second for a 93-91 Lakers lead. The Bulls, out of timeouts, had a final chance, but a midcourt heave from Pippen at the buzzer caromed off the back of the rim.

This was also the last time any game of the NBA Finals aired in the afternoon (Eastern Time Zone), with every game of the NBA Finals since this game in 1991 airing in prime time, including all weekend games. To date, this is the most recent time any finals game in any of the four major American sports leagues started before 6:00 p.m. Eastern.

Game 2

The biggest decision of the game was putting Scottie Pippen on Magic Johnson, while Michael Jordan guarded Vlade Divac. For the Bulls, the hero was Horace Grant who led the Bulls with 14 first half points, while Jordan only had 2 points for the first 20 minutes; however, for Jordan, this shooting drought would only prove to be temporary and Jordan would hit his next 13 shots in compensation. The Lakers were in the game even when Chicago was leading 58-51 until Byron Scott fouled Pippen, and the Bulls would make 17 of their next 20 field goals in the third quarter despite Jordan spending time on the bench with foul trouble. By the time Jordan returned, their lead was 16 and then Jordan led the Bulls to an 11-0 run to a Bulls victory. The signature moment of the series came when Jordan accelerated towards the basket, raised the ball in his right hand for a dunk, then, to avoid a potential Sam Perkins block, switched the ball to his left and banked in a layup that caused a booming standing ovation at Chicago Stadium.

Game 3

The Bulls were having trouble in the frontcourt (in Game 1, the Lakers frontcourt outscored Chicago's 60-31). In Game 3, the Lakers would be the ones having trouble, setting a rebounding low in the Finals. Despite this problem, the Lakers went for an 18-2 run that brought them from 3 down (49-52) to 13 up (67-54). The Bulls would answer with a 20-7 run that would tie the game in the 4th quarter at 74. Horace Grant's layup gave the Bulls a 90-87 lead with 1:07 to play.  Perkins then scored to cut the Bulls' lead to 90-89 with 49 seconds left.  After a Bulls' miss, Divac scored on a layup and was fouled.  He made the free throw to give the Lakers a 92-90 lead with 10.9 seconds remaining. Jordan made a 14-foot jump shot just inches away from Divac's fingertips with 3.4 seconds left to tie the game at 92 and force overtime. In overtime, Jordan would score half of the Bulls' 12 points to win the game.

Game 4

The Lakers had a 28-27 lead in the first quarter; only the second time in the 1991 playoffs that a team led the Bulls at the end of the first quarter. This did not matter as Chicago went on a 19-9 run to start the second period and gain a 46-37 lead. While Michael Jordan scored 11 points in the second quarter, the Lakers only made 12 of their 41 shots in the second and third quarters. The Lakers faced a huge blow as Worthy and Scott left the game (and eventually the series) with ankle and shoulder injuries, respectively (Worthy's ankle injury from the Conference Finals against Portland had flared up, and Scott injured his shoulder after slipping on a wet spot on the floor). With the lack of Worthy and Scott, and bad shooting (especially from Sam Perkins), the Bulls were able to take a 16-point lead in the third quarter. The Lakers refused to go down and shrank the deficit to 7 points in the fourth quarter, but it was the closest they would get, as Pippen and Jordan led the Bulls on a 19-8 run to put them one game away from their first NBA Championship.

Game 5

The Lakers were facing elimination, and the absences of James Worthy and Byron Scott were not any help to the Lakers. This would not stop Magic Johnson as Johnson had 20 assists in the game. Despite that while Johnson also got 11 rebounds, Jordan guarded Magic Johnson in Game 5 which led Magic to struggle by scoring 16 points on 33% (4/12) shooting with 6 turnovers. Elden Campbell outscored Michael Jordan with 13 points in the first half. The Lakers still fought and even led 93-90 in the fourth quarter, but the Bulls went on a 9-0 run, and Paxson's 10 points in the final half of the fourth quarter helped secure the Chicago Bulls', and Jordan's, first NBA title. It was the only one of the Bulls' six Finals appearances to end in four games to one. This was also the last NBA Finals game to be played in The Forum (by the time the Lakers returned to the NBA Finals, they had moved to the new Staples Center).

Scottie Pippen led the Bulls with 32 points and collected 13 rebounds. Jordan, who was named the Finals MVP, added 30 points and 10 assists.

Player statistics

Chicago Bulls

|-
| align="left" |  || 5 || 0 || 7.4 || .455 || .000 || .000 || 0.6 || 0.8 || 0.4 || 0.0 || 2.0 
|-
| align="left" |  || 5 || 5 || 32.0 || .435 || .000 || .667 || 5.0 || 2.4 || 0.6 || 0.6 || 8.8 
|-
| align="left" |  || 5 || 5 || 39.6 || .627 || .000 || .750 || 7.8 || 1.6 || 1.6 || 0.6 || 14.6 
|-
| align="left" |  || 5 || 0 || 10.6 || .391 || .167 || .000 || 0.6 || 0.2 || 0.0 || 0.0 || 3.8 
|-
| align="left" |  || 1 || 0 || 2.0 || .000 || .000 || .000 || 0.0 || 0.0 || 0.0 || 0.0 || 0.0 
|-! style="background:#FDE910;"
| align="left" |  || 5 || 5 || 44.0 || .558 || .500 || .848 || 6.6 || 11.4 || 2.8 || 1.4 || 31.2 
|-
| align="left" |  || 2 || 0 || 3.0 || .000 || .000 || 1.000 || 0.5 || 0.0 || 0.0 || 0.0 || 1.0 
|-
| align="left" |  || 5 || 0 || 18.0 || .615 || .000 || .000 || 2.8 || 0.6 || 1.0 || 1.0 || 3.2 
|-
| align="left" |  || 5 || 5 || 31.8 || .653 || .250 || 1.000 || 2.0 || 3.4 || 1.0 || 0.0 || 13.4 
|-
| align="left" |  || 5 || 0 || 7.4 || .600 || .000 || 1.000 || 2.4 || 0.2 || 0.0 || 0.2 || 1.6 
|-
| align="left" |  || 5 || 5 || 43.6 || .453 || .200 || .862 || 9.4 || 6.6 || 2.4 || 1.0 || 20.8 
|-
| align="left" |  || 4 || 0 || 11.3 || .500 || .000 || .667 || 2.3 || 0.8 || 0.0 || 0.3 || 2.0 

Los Angeles Lakers

|-
| align="left" |  || 3 || 0 || 11.0 || .625 || .000 || .750 || 1.3 || 0.0 || 1.0 || 0.7 || 7.7 
|-
| align="left" |  || 5 || 5 || 41.6 || .565 || .000 || 1.000 || 8.8 || 2.0 || 1.8 || 2.4 || 18.2 
|-
| align="left" |  || 4 || 0 || 5.0 || .375 || .000 || .500 || 0.5 || 0.0 || 0.0 || 0.0 || 1.8 
|-
| align="left" |  || 5 || 1 || 22.6 || .313 || .667 || .583 || 5.6 || 0.2 || 0.6 || 0.0 || 5.8 
|-
| align="left" |  || 5 || 5 || 45.6 || .431 || .286 || .951 || 8.0 || 12.4 || 1.2 || 0.0 || 18.6 
|-
| align="left" |  || 5 || 5 || 41.2 || .406 || .385 || .759 || 7.6 || 1.0 || 0.4 || 1.4 || 16.6 
|-
| align="left" |  || 4 || 4 || 35.0 || .278 || .200 || .700 || 1.8 || 1.8 || 0.8 || 0.0 || 4.5 
|-
| align="left" |  || 2 || 0 || 16.0 || .714 || .000 || .667 || 0.5 || 1.0 || 0.5 || 0.0 || 6.0 
|-
| align="left" |  || 5 || 1 || 14.2 || .333 || .000 || .786 || 0.4 || 0.2 || 0.6 || 0.2 || 5.0 
|-
| align="left" |  || 1 || 0 || 10.0 || .000 || .000 || .000 || 0.0 || 0.0 || 0.0 || 0.0 || 0.0 
|-
| align="left" |  || 4 || 4 || 41.0 || .479 || .167 || .667 || 3.0 || 2.0 || 1.0 || 0.0 || 19.3

Media coverage

As previously stated, this was the first Finals to be telecast in the United States by NBC. NBC Sports used Marv Albert on play-by-play and Mike Fratello as color analyst. Ahmad Rashad (for the Bulls) and Steve "Snapper" Jones (for the Lakers) served as sideline reporters.

This was the only NBA Finals series in which recently departed Lakers coach Pat Riley worked as a broadcaster; he was paired with Bob Costas in the pre-game, half-time and post-game presentations. Riley was then hired as head coach by the New York Knicks in the 1991 offseason and would eventually win another title with the Miami Heat in 2006.

In Chicago, this was Jim Durham's only Finals appearance as the Bulls' radio announcer (he also announced Bulls games on television via simulcast during the regular season and playoffs). He would later announce several NBA Finals games on ESPN Radio. Neil Funk succeeded Durham the following season and was the radio voice on five NBA Finals involving the Bulls (1992, 1993, 1996, 1997 and 1998). The simulcasts would also end after the season, with Wayne Larrivee (on WGN-TV) and Tom Dore (on cable) becoming the Bulls' television announcers the next season; by the 2008–09 NBA season Funk was calling television play-by-play on both networks while Chuck Swirsky called radio play-by-play.

Aftermath
The Bulls championship started the dynasty that lasted through the 1990s. In the 1991-92 NBA season the Bulls won their second straight NBA title, winning a then-franchise record 67 wins and defeated the Portland Trail Blazers in six games of the 1992 NBA Finals.

The Lakers' Showtime era would end on November 7, 1991, as Magic Johnson announced his retirement due to the HIV virus. He did, however, play in the 1992 NBA All-Star Game and eventually with the Dream Team in the 1992 Summer Olympics. The Lakers would decline in the years following Magic's retirement, being eliminated in the first round of the playoffs two straight years (1992 - 1993) before missing the playoffs entirely in 1994. It would be nine years before the Lakers returned to the NBA Finals; by then they had moved to the new Staples Center (now Crypto.com Arena), marking the 1991 Finals the last to be held at the Forum.

Both teams came close to facing each other anew in the 1998 NBA Finals; however, the Lakers (by then led by Shaquille O'Neal and Kobe Bryant) were swept by the Utah Jazz in the Western Conference Finals.

Chicago and Los Angeles have been Major Professional Sports Leagues for the other Sports in the Tournament while MLB's Chicago White Sox And Los Angeles Angels In 2005 ALCS the White Sox win over Angels in 5 games advance to the World Series while Chicago Cubs And Los Angeles Dodgers have three Playoff Meetings in 2008 2016 and 2017 while NHL's Chicago Blackhawks and Los Angeles Kings have three Playoff Meetings in 1974 2013 and 2014.

See also
1991 NBA Playoffs

References

External links
NBA History

National Basketball Association Finals
Finals
NBA
NBA
GMA Network television specials
20th century in Los Angeles
NBA Finals
1990s in Chicago
NBA Finals
Basketball competitions in Chicago
Basketball competitions in Inglewood, California
NBA Finals
NBA Finals